Giuseppe Tommasi (born 3 June 1946) is an Italian judoka. He competed in the men's lightweight event at the 1972 Summer Olympics.

References

1946 births
Living people
Italian male judoka
Olympic judoka of Italy
Judoka at the 1972 Summer Olympics